The 109th Infantry was an infantry regiment of the British Indian Army. The regiment traces its origins to 1768, when it was raised as the 5th Battalion, Bombay Sepoys.

The regiment's first action was during the Mysore Campaign in the Third Anglo-Mysore War. It was next involved in the Battle of Seringapatam in the Fourth Anglo-Mysore War, and next used in the Siege of Multan during the Second Anglo-Sikh War. Its last campaign in the 19th century was the Second Afghan War. During World War I it was attached to the Aden Brigade, which was formed to protect the important naval refueling point at Aden.

After World War I the Indian government reformed the army moving from single- to multi-battalion regiments. In 1922, the 109th Infantry became the 4th Battalion 4th Bombay Grenadiers. After independence it was one of the regiments allocated to the Indian Army.

Predecessor names 
5th Battalion, Bombay Sepoys - 1768
2nd Battalion, 1st Bombay Native Infantry - 1796
9th Bombay Native Infantry - 1824
9th Bombay Infantry - 1885
109th Infantry - 1903

References

Bibliography 

Moberly, F.J. (1923). Official History of the War: Mesopotamia Campaign, Imperial War Museum. 

British Indian Army infantry regiments
Bombay Presidency
Military units and formations established in 1768
Military units and formations disestablished in 1922
1768 establishments in the British Empire